Ralph Raymond (28 November 1912 – 11 October 1982) was an Australian cricketer. He played in one first-class match for Queensland in 1933/34.

See also
 List of Queensland first-class cricketers

References

External links
 

1912 births
1982 deaths
Australian cricketers
Queensland cricketers
Cricketers from Queensland